Existenz is an on-line biannual academic journal covering research in philosophy, religion, politics, and the arts. Established in 2006 by its founding editors Alan M. Olson and Helmut Wautischer and is sponsored by the Karl Jaspers Society of North America. Its title, Existenz, derives from an essential feature of the philosophy of Karl Jaspers, namely, the notion of mögliche Existenz or "possible self-being" for which Jaspers became famous as one of the world's leading existentialist philosophers in the 20th century.

The journal serves as a publication outlet for Jaspers scholarship, cooperates with various international Jaspers societies, including those in the United States, Japan, Poland, Germany, Austria, Italy, and Croatia, and also considers direct submissions of articles for online publication. Existenz is indexed by The Philosopher's Index and included in the EBSCO database.

See also
List of philosophy journals

External links
 

Philosophy journals
English-language journals
Biannual journals
Publications established in 2006
20th-century philosophy
Daseinsanalysis
Works about existentialism

de:Kategorie:Daseinsanalyse